Carabus agamemnon is a species of ground beetle in the Carabinae subfamily, that is endemic to Sichuan, China.

References

agamemnon
Beetles described in 1943
Endemic fauna of Sichuan